Pope Paul III (r. 1534–1549) created 71 cardinals in twelve consistories.

18 December 1534

 Alessandro Farnese, iuniore
 Guido Ascanio Sforza di Santa Fiora

21 May 1535

 Nikolaus von Schönberg
 Girolamo Ghinucci
 Giacomo Simoneta
 John Fisher
 Jean du Bellay
 Gasparo Contarini
 Marino Caracciolo

Desiderius Erasmus was offered a cardinal's hat, but he declined.

22 December 1536

 Gian Pietro Carafa
 Giovanni Maria Ciocchi del Monte
 Ennio Filonardi
 Jacopo Sadoleto
 Cristoforo Giacobazzi
 Charles de Hémard de Denonville
 Rodolfo Pio da Carpi
 Reginald Pole
 Rodrigo Luis de Borja y de Castre-Pinós
 Girolamo Aleandro (created in pectore)
 Niccolò Caetani

18 October 1538

 Pedro Sarmiento

20 December 1538

 Juan Álvarez de Toledo
 Pedro Fernández Manrique
 Robert de Lénoncourt
 David Beaton
 Ippolito II d'Este
 Pietro Bembo

19 December 1539

 Federigo Fregoso
 Pierre de La Baume
 Antoine Sanguin
 Uberto Gambara
 Pierpaolo Parisio
 Marcello Cervini
 Bartolomeo Guidiccioni
 Ascanio Parisani
 Dionisio Laurerio
 Enrique de Borja y Aragón
 Giacomo Savelli
 Miguel da Silva

2 June 1542

 Giovanni Morone
 Marcello Crescenzi
 Giovanni Vincenzo Acquaviva d'Aragona
 Pomponio Cecci
 Roberto Pucci
 Tommaso Badia
 Giovanni Andrea Cortese
 Cristoforo Madruzzo

19 December 1544

 Gaspar de Ávalos de la Cueva
 Francisco Mendoza de Bobadilla
 Bartolomé de la Cueva y Toledo
 Georges d'Armagnac
 Jacques d'Annebaut
 Otto Truchsess von Waldburg
 Andrea Cornaro
 Francesco Sfondrati
 Federico Cesi
 Durante Duranti
 Niccolò Ardinghelli
 Girolamo Recanati Capodiferro
 Tiberio Crispo

16 December 1545

 Pedro Pacheco de Villena
 Georges II d'Amboise
 Henrique de Portugal
 Ranuccio Farnese

27 July 1547
 Charles de Guise
 Giulio della Rovere

9 January 1548

 Charles de Bourbon-Vendôme

8 April 1549

 Girolamo Verallo
 Giovanni Angelo de' Medici
 Filiberto Ferrero
 Bernardino Maffei

References

Additional sources
 

Paul III
16th-century Catholicism
College of Cardinals